Nachna Onda Nei (Punjabi: ਨਚਣਾ ਓੰਦਾ ਨਹੀਂ, نچنا اوندا نہیں) is a song by Scottish bhangra group Tigerstyle with Kaka Bhaniawala on lead vocals. It is a mash-up of "Billie Jean" by Michael Jackson and "Under Pressure" by Queen ft. David Bowie with new bhangra-style instruments and Punjabi vocals being sung over the top. The song also uses a sample of "Fantastic Voyage" by Coolio (which itself relies heavily on samples from "Fantastic Voyage" by Lakeside).

While never formally released as a single, it made #62 on the UK Singles Chart in 2008, after being used in performances by Signature in the talent show Britain's Got Talent.

References

2008 singles
2008 songs
Songs written by Michael Jackson
Songs written by David Bowie
Songs written by John Deacon
Songs written by Brian May
Songs written by Freddie Mercury
Songs written by Roger Taylor (Queen drummer)